Abhe Singh Yadav is a member of the Haryana Legislative Assembly from the BJP representing the Nangal Chaudhry Vidhan Sabha constituency in Haryana.
In March 2021 Haryana Assembly Session, Abhe Singh Yadav was awarded Best MLA award in Haryana Assembly along with Varun Chaudhary from INC, Best MLA Award for Abhe Singh Yadav, Varun Chaudhary.

References 

1979 births
Living people
Bharatiya Janata Party politicians from Haryana
People from Mahendragarh district
Haryana MLAs 2019–2024
Haryana MLAs 2014–2019